Operation Pokpoong (폭풍작전; Korean for Storm) was an offensive operation of the Democratic People's Republic of Korea (DPRK) against the Republic of Korea (ROK) that marked the start of the Korean War. The operation began at 04:00 KST on 25 June 1950 along the 38th parallel north without a declaration of war.

The operation was planned by the DPRK and the Soviet Union, which supplied the DPRK with weapons, tanks, and aircraft. The DPRK was able to take control of the southern capital of Seoul within a few days.

The original goal for the operation was to occupy the entire Korean Peninsula by 15 August 1950 ― 50 days, with an average 10 km advance each day ― in commemoration of the 5th anniversary of the Gwangbokjeol. However, heavy losses incurred by the DPRK II Corps, which was in charge of the eastern front, at the hands of the Republic of Korea Army (ROKA) 6th Infantry Division, enabled the ROK to delay the DPRK advance. The United States joined the war on 27 June and the United Nations Security Council passed Resolution 84 on 7 July.

Background
Joseph Stalin’s influence over Kim Il-Sung dictated the timing of the invasion. Kim Il-Sung and ROK leader Syngman Rhee both wanted to reunify Korea. Kim's objective was to achieve reunification through force. Kim was not able to achieve his goal without Stalin's assistance. On 30 January 1950, Stalin contacted Ambassador Terenty Shtykov and explained he was ready to help organize an invasion plan. Stalin noted that in order to capture South Korea, Kim Il-Sung would need to be prepared to minimise the risk of a lengthy battle. In the lead up to April 1950, Kim requested to launch an invasion on repeated occasions but Stalin did not allow Kim to launch the invasion until favorable tactical conditions in the Far East emerged.

Since March 1950, the Korean People's Army (KPA) started to build up its armament, and redeployed its troops to get ready to attack South Korea. On 16 May officers of the DPRK and Soviet Union began final inspections for the war.

Kim Il-sung met Stalin in Moscow in April 1950 to formulate the invasion plan. Stalin permitted the plan on the condition that the Chinese allies were also in agreement. On 13 May 1950, Kim Il-Sung went to Beijing to meet Mao Zedong. On 14 May 1950, Mao reviewed Stalin's telegram and approved the North Korean invasion. Stalin had dispatched Lieutenant General Vasiliev, to prepare the invasion plan before the Stalin-Kim meeting was held in Moscow in April 1950. On 29 May 1950, Vasiliev and General Kang Kon, the Chief of the General Staff of the KPA, finalised the invasion plan.

On 10 June the DPRK Ministry of People's Defense secretly summoned all division and brigade commanders to Pyongyang for a meeting. Kang Kon, ordered troops to be fully ready for an offensive operation in disguise of defensive operation by 23 June. On 11 June the KPA was reorganized into two corps and the divisions that were placed at the rear started to move as close as 10 to 15 km of north to the 38th Parallel. Advanced forces from the KPA 2nd Division moved to Kumhwa on the same day. The entire division was placed in Kumhwa by 14 June 1950. By 23 June 1950, all KPA forces involved in the invasion were positioned around the 38th Parallel.

On 18 June the Ministry of People's Defense sent Reconnaissance Order Number 1 (정찰명령 제1호) to division commanders to gather information about locations of the ROKA forces and terrain. On 22 June after completion of reconnaissance and reorganization and approval from Stalin, Soviet military advisors ordered the Ministry of People's Defense to send Engagement Order Number 1 (전투명령 제1호) to its divisions.

In the meantime, Kim Il-sung informed Stalin that the war would be started on 25 June and Stalin consented to the plan. As scheduled, the KPA began the operation and crossed the 38th Parallel at 04:00 KST on 25 June 1950. When the war began, Kim Il-sung held a governmental emergency meeting and stated the following to the members of the Workers' Party of Korea who did not realize the situation:

Order of battle 
Almost the entire forces from both sides were involved in the operation either directly or indirectly. The order is at the beginning stage of the operation, and only the major combatants are listed below.

Democratic People's Republic of Korea

Army 
 I Corps
 1st Infantry Division
 1st Infantry Regiment
 2nd Infantry Regiment
 3rd Infantry Regiment
 3rd Infantry Division
 7th Infantry Regiment
 8th Infantry Regiment
 9th Infantry Regiment
 4th Infantry Division
 5th Infantry Regiment
 16th Infantry Regiment
 18th Infantry Regiment
 6th Infantry Division
 13th Infantry Regiment
 14th Infantry Regiment
 15th Infantry Regiment
 II Corps
 2nd Infantry Division
 5th Infantry Division
 10th Infantry Regiment
 11th Infantry Regiment
 12th Infantry Regiment
 7th Infantry Division
 8th Infantry Division
 81st Infantry Regiment
 82nd Infantry Regiment
 83rd Infantry Regiment
 15th Infantry Division
 48th Infantry Regiment
 49th Infantry Regiment
 50th Infantry Regiment
 9th Infantry Division
 10th Infantry Division
 13th Infantry Division
 105th Armored Brigade
 107th Armored Regiment
 109th Armored Regiment
 203rd Armored Regiment
 206th Mechanized Regiment
 549th Infantry Regiment
 766th Infantry Regiment

38th Parallel Guard 
 1st Guard Brigade
 3rd Guard Brigade

Republic of Korea

Army 
 Capital Division
 3rd Infantry Regiment
 18th Infantry Regiment
 1st Infantry Division
 11th Infantry Regiment
 12th Infantry Regiment
 13th Infantry Regiment
 2nd Infantry Division
 5th Infantry Regiment
 16th Infantry Regiment
 25th Infantry Regiment
 3rd Infantry Division
 18th Infantry Regiment
 22nd Infantry Regiment
 23rd Infantry Regiment
 5th Infantry Division
 15th Infantry Regiment
 20th Infantry Regiment
 6th Infantry Division
 2nd Infantry Regiment
 7th Infantry Regiment
 19th Infantry Regiment
 7th Infantry Division
 1st Infantry Regiment
 9th Infantry Regiment
 8th Infantry Division
 10th Infantry Regiment
 21st Infantry Regiment
 17th Infantry Regiment

Controversy over origins of battle 
There have been conflicting accounts regarding the opening phases of the battle from sources on both sides. This resulted in discrepancies about which army initiated military action on 25 June 1950.

A report on behalf of the United Nations Commission on Korea was submitted on 24 June 1950 by two Australian military observers, Major F. S. B. Peach and Squadron Leader R. J. Rankin. The report made claim that ROK forces were organised entirely for defence and were in no condition to carry out an attack on a large scale against the forces of the north. The inadequate resources of the ROKA, in particular the absence of armor, air support and heavy artillery, rendered a South Korean invasion of the North militarily impossible. At 17:00 on 25 June the field observers had reported that North Korean forces had that morning mounted a surprise attack all along the 38th Parallel.

However, Kim Il Sung had claimed in a broadcast made on 26 June at 09:20 that South Korea had attacked the north in the section of Haeju, provoking counterattacks. In the light of the report by Peach and Rankin, UNCOK unanimously rejected the North Korean contention. There remains undisclosed information from the Soviet and North Korean side.

Battle
On 24 June 1950, the North Korean forces were ordered in their starting positions by 24:00.

On 25 June Washington received a report at 10:00 detailing that North Korean forces has invaded the south across several locations that morning. The report claimed combat was initiated at 04:40 when Ongjin was hit by North Korean artillery fire. Individual KPA units advanced 3 to 5 kilometres into South Korean territory within the first three hours. The ROKA put up a strong resistance in the direction of Ongjin, Kaizin and Seoul. Osin, Kaesong and Sinyuri were captured on the first day. KPA forces advanced 12 kilometres in the Sunsen direction and 8 kilometres along the eastern coast.

Two amphibious landings occurred on the coast south of Kangnung at 05:25. One landing occurred in the Korio region and consisted of two battalions of naval infantry and 1,000 partisans. The other landing occurred in the Urutsyn area and consisted of 600 partisans. The city of Urutsyn was captured. The South Korean military engaged the North Korean warships but the landings were successful.

The KPA invasion was spearheaded by Soviet manufactured T-34 medium, diesel-fuelled tanks that could operate at up to thirty kilometres an hour. The T-34 was equipped with high-velocity 85 mm guns and was lined with medium armour. The armor proved nearly impregnable to the ill-equipped ROKA which lacked tanks and antitank guns capable of penetrating the T-34's armor. The T-34 weighed 29 tons, making it light enough to withstand limits on Korean railroads due to bridge capacities being thirty tons. Air support was provided by 150 Soviet manufactured Yakovlev Yak-9 fighters, Ilyushin Il-10 attack bombers and Yakovlev Yak-11 trainer aircraft. The aircraft provided tactical air support and also bombarded Seoul and strategic locations.

The battle continued on 26 June with further advances by KPA forces into South Korea.The Kaisan and Ongjin peninsula were cleared. The 1st and 4th Divisions captured Tongducheb and Bunsan. The 2nd Division took Siunseen. The 6th Division crossed the bay and captured the point in the direction of Kimpo Airfield. The forces from the amphibious landings advanced and had taken the port of Tubuiri. The main force advanced through the Uijeongbu corridor towards Seoul.

The South Korean forces did not have enough aircraft or tanks to counter the invasion. A significant portion of the South Korean forces, numbering 65,000 combat troops and 33,000 support troops, began deserting. On 28 June ROK forces demolished the Hangang Bridge in an attempt to slow the KPA invasion. The demolition resulted in South Korean refugee casualties and stranded the ROKA 5th Division. KPA forces were able to cross the river later that day and occupy Seoul.

North Korean command during battle
A Soviet report made during the invasion highlighted the inadequacies in KPA operations. Communication within the KPA was inefficient. The general staff did not direct battle, since from the beginning of the forward advance staff communication was weak. The unit commanders did not receive commands from senior staff. The report stated that the KPA command did not have battle experience. Once Soviet military advisers withdrew the battle was poorly commanded. The directed use of tanks and artillery in battle was tactically unsound. However, the KPA soldiers were enthusiastic and dedicated to completing their role. The people of North Korea also responded positively to the news of the invasion. They had a strong belief in the North Korean government and the KPA.

Propaganda
In the United States, the invasion was reported in mainstream media as an act of aggression by North Korea. The event also became an additional source of political division during the Cold War period. An article from The New York Times (27 June 1950) headlined U.S. Blames Russia describes the event as an “act of aggression”, “lawless” and "an invasion of the American-sponsored republic as another threat by Russia into a soft spot of the free countries.” It also claimed “the [US] Administration held Soviet Union responsible as the motivating power behind the North Korean government.”

The official North Korean history of the Korean War describes the battle under the title ‘Outstanding and Brilliant Victory’, and claims that the battle was an anti-imperialist defence measure against the “enemies of the people” [US]. The United States imperialists had successfully overtaken South Korean. The United States prompted the South Korean forces to launch a surprise armed invasion of the DPRK at dawn on 25 June 1950. Over 100,000 South Korean soldiers attacked, penetrating two kilometres into Northern Korea territory. The aim was to conquer the [North] Korean people. The report refers to the South Korean troops as “puppets” of the “aggressive, imperialist” United States and that the “country and people were faced with a grave danger.”

Aftermath
On 30 June President of the United States Harry S. Truman released a statement that indicated the invasion of South Korea had grown the threat of Communism to the Pacific area and the United States. In response to the invasion, Truman ordered United States provide assistance with air and land forces in Korea. Moreover, Truman ordered the United States Seventh Fleet to prevent any attack on Formosa and strengthened the United States forces in the Philippines.

As a result of North Korea's invasion, the United Nations Security Council (UNSC) passed United Nations Security Council Resolution 84. The Resolution authorised the use of the UN flag in operations against North Korean forces and those nations partaking. The UNSC provided a recommendation to members to provide assistance to the Republic of Korea in repelling the North Korean attack and restoring worldwide peace and security.

References 

Pokpoong
June 1950 events in Asia
July 1950 events in Asia
1950 in military history
Battles and operations of the Korean War in 1950  
Battles of the Korean War involving South Korea 
Battles of the Korean War involving North Korea 
Battles of the Korean War involving the United States
Battles of the Korean War involving the Soviet Union